Craig Kelly (born 31 October 1970) is an English actor and voice-over narrator. He is known for his roles as Vince Tyler in the Channel 4 television series Queer as Folk and as Luke Strong in Coronation Street.

Early life
Kelly was born on 31 October 1970 in Lytham St Annes near Blackpool, Lancashire. He is the brother of actor Dean Lennox Kelly.

Career
Kelly moved to London and attended the Drama Centre from 1989 to 1992, where he studied the Stanislavski School of method acting alongside John Simm and Joe Duttine.

Graduating in 1992, Kelly played a minor speaking role in Titanic as Assistant Wireless Operator, Harold Bride and also as Russell Muir in the film When Saturday Comes.

TV work
Kelly is best known for his role as Vince Tyler in Queer as Folk. He also appeared in Casualty as Daniel Perryman between 1995 and 1996. A very brief role was as the Mercedes-Benz driver in the Rabbit in Your Headlights video, who utters the line "Nice coat, mate" before speeding off. In the 1998 BBC series of The Children of the New Forest, Craig played Abel Courbould, the villainous puritan preacher. Craig also starred opposite Amanda Holden in the ITV series The Grimleys as Mr Treblecock, the school lothario. He played the young father of Alison Mundy in a second series episode of Afterlife in 2006.

In 2003, Kelly featured in the webcast Doctor Who adventure Scream of the Shalka. He later guest-starred in the third series of the BBC's Waking the Dead, in which he played a transgender woman who is released from prison on appeal after murdering her father.

In November 2008, Kelly landed the role of the new underworld factory boss, Luke Strong, in ITV's Coronation Street. His character first appeared on 20 February 2009 and Kelly departed in the episode that aired on 19 October 2009.

On 25 August 2009, it was announced that he would take part in Series 7 of BBC One's Strictly Come Dancing, partnering Flavia Cacace. Kelly was the 8th celebrity eliminated from the competition on 7 November 2009 in a special show from Blackpool Tower Ballroom.

Kelly starred alongside his brother in the ITV1 drama Collision, which aired over five consecutive nights in November 2009.

Film work
He played Cristian O'Neil in The Young Americans, with Harvey Keitel (1993). Kelly was also in James Cameron's 1997 film Titanic and played the part of radio operator Harold Sydney Bride. He appeared in Spice World with a minor speaking role in which he speaks to Geri (Ginger Spice). Kelly had a small role in the 1999 sci-fi film Wing Commander playing Falk, the ship's radar man.

Voice-over work
Kelly is a prolific voiceover artist, appearing on numerous adverts as well as BBC idents and, more recently, on Channel 4 idents. He has also narrated for various television programmes, including Channel 4's Shipwrecked: Battle of the Islands (2006–2009), E4's Shipwrecked: The Island 2011 (2s narration on Sally Morgan's Star Psychic Show, series 6 of The Real Hustle on BBC Three (a show his brother narrated for two series) and more recently, the popular Channel 4 show Rich House Poor House. He is currently the station voice for Manchester's Key 103. He also voices a 2014 advert for Nutella. He has voiced Shipping Wars UK on Channel 4.

Personal life
Kelly and his wife Camilla married in 2009. Kelly has a keen interest in kickboxing, in which he has a black belt.

Filmography

References

External links
 Official website
 

1970 births
Living people
People from Lytham St Annes
Alumni of the Drama Centre London
English male voice actors
English male television actors
English male film actors